Labrinth (real name Timothy McKenzie) is an English recording artist and record producer from London. After producing Master Shortie's A.D.H.D. in 2009 (on which he also performed all instruments), Labrinth came to prominence in 2010 for his work on Tinie Tempah's debut album, Disc-Overy, for which he produced the singles "Pass Out", "Frisky" (on both of which he also performed) and "Wonderman". During the same year, he also appeared on tracks by Professor Green ("Oh My God", from Alive Till I'm Dead) and Devlin ("Let It Go", from Bud, Sweat and Beers). He released his first single in September, "Let the Sun Shine", which reached number three on the UK Singles Chart. Whilst continuing to record his debut album, Labrinth also performed on and co-produced the charity single "Teardrop" for Children in Need 2011, along with a range of artists including Tulisa and Rizzle Kicks.

In March 2012, Labrinth released his debut album Electronic Earth. Written and produced largely by Labrinth and his manager Marc "Da Digglar" Williams, the album also features songwriting credits for Rami Yacoub, Carl Falk, Mike Posner, and more. Following the success of "Let the Sun Shine", and second and third singles "Earthquake" and "Last Time", three more singles were released from the album: "Express Yourself", "Treatment" and "Beneath Your Beautiful" with Emeli Sandé, which was Labrinth's first single to top the UK Singles Chart. Deluxe versions of the album featured bonus tracks with contributions from Wretch 32, Busta Rhymes, Tinchy Stryder, and more.

Later in the year, Labrinth featured on the Plan B single "Playing with Fire", from the album ill Manors, and also released an extended play (EP) of previously unreleased tracks, Atomic, which featured a wide range of artists including Ed Sheeran and Wretch 32. Labrinth reunited with Tinie Tempah in 2013, featuring on the tracks "It's OK" and "Lover Not a Fighter" on his second album Demonstration, the latter of which was released as a single the following year and reached number 16 in the UK. 2014 also featured the first releases from Labrinth's upcoming second album: "Let It Be" was released in September and reached number 11 in the UK, and "Jealous" followed in November and peaked at number seven. Labrinth also collaborated with Sigma on the single "Higher", which was released in March 2015.

Songs

Notes
A.  Labrinth was credited with all instruments on the whole of the album A.D.H.D..
B.  Atomic was released with no album notes, so writing credits are assumed based on the artists featured on each track.
C.  "Earthquake" (All Stars Remix), "T.O.P." and "Up in Flames" were featured on deluxe editions of Electronic Earth only.

See also
Labrinth discography

References

External links
List of Labrinth songs at AllMusic
Labrinth official website

Labrinth